Gábor Alapy (15 April 1912 – 11 April 1999) was a Hungarian rower. He competed at the 1936 Summer Olympics in Berlin with the men's eight where they came fifth.

References

External links

1912 births
1999 deaths
Hungarian male rowers
Olympic rowers of Hungary
Rowers at the 1936 Summer Olympics
Rowers from Budapest
European Rowing Championships medalists